The men's tournament was one of two handball tournaments at the 1980 Summer Olympics. It was the fourth appearance of a men's handball tournament as a medal event at the Olympic Games.

Qualification

Results

Preliminary round
12 teams played each other in two groups to decide for which place each of them will compete in the final round.

Group A

Group B

Final round

Eleventh place game

Ninth place game

Seventh place game

Fifth place game

Bronze medal game

Gold medal game

Rankings and statistics

Final ranking

Top goalscorers

Team rosters

References

Men's tournament
Men's events at the 1980 Summer Olympics